The Battle of Yijiangshan Islands was a conflict between forces of the National Revolutionary Army (NRA) of the Republic of China  and the People's Liberation Army (PLA) of the People's Republic of China, over one of the last strongholds of Nationalist (ROC) forces near mainland China on the Yijiangshan Islands. The conflict occurred from January 18 to January 20, 1955, during the First Taiwan Strait Crisis, and resulted in a PLA victory and the complete destruction of the ROC garrison.

Prelude

Geography
The Yijiangshan Islands consist of two islands, the Northern Yijiang Island and the Southern Yijiang Island, and the region is approximately 1.2 square kilometers (0.46 square miles) in area.  Due to its strategic location near the coast of Zhejiang, it had become a forward base for the Nationalist defense of Chinese coastal islands centered on Dachen Island, as well as a base for launching guerrilla attacks on mainland China.

Opposing forces
The Nationalist defense force consisted of the following units and totaled more than 1000:
Yijiangshan Regional Headquarters
The 2nd Assault Group
The 4th Assault Group
The 4th Assault Squadron
One artillery squadron
In addition, the Nationalist defenders could call up the air and naval support when needed.

The Communist attackers totaled more than 5,000, with the landing force totaling one regiment and one battalion from the following units:
The 178th regiment of the 60th Division of the 20th Army
The 180th regiment of the 60th Division of the 20th Army
137 naval vessels, (including more than 70 landing vessels, and more than 40 escort vessels). 
184 aircraft from a total of 22 groups, 7 artillery battalions, and 2 anti-aircraft artillery regiments assigned to support the landing force.
In addition, over 30,000 civilians and three dozen civilian ships were mobilized for logistic support.

Battle
When the fight began on January 18, 1955, the Nationalist air force and navy did not participate due to overwhelming Communist firepower. The battle started at 08:00 with People's Liberation Army (PLA) bombers from three groups and ground attack aircraft from 2 groups bombing and strafing the islands. At the same time, bombers from another group and ground attack aircraft from the second group began bombing and strafing the Dachen Islands as a diversion. At 09:00, 50 long range artillery pieces shelled the Yijiangshan Islands.

Around noon, 70+ naval vessels carrying the landing force sailed from Gaodao, Queerao, Toumenshan Island in three formations in two waves, with more than 40 escort vessels. 2 hours later, the 10 specially converted naval vessels with rocket launchers bombarded Yijiangshan island in conjunction with bombers from 3 groups and 1 squadron, ground attack aircraft from 2 groups, before landing on 20 landing spots.  However, the defenders took advantage of their fortifications and severely disrupted the attackers’ formation after their successful landing.  As a result, most of the Communist casualties suffered during the battle were at this initial stage.

The Communists immediately called for fire support after they met with fierce enemy fire, and PLA aircraft responded by attacking enemy positions at extremely low altitude. With the first line of defence quickly overpowered by flamethrowers, bombs, and artillery, the PLA gained ground rapidly. Most of the PLA casualties (as many as 200 dead and 400 wounded) resulted from attacks from two machine-gun nests manned by 2 families. Air strikes and massive artillery bombardments eventually knocked out these two positions. As the demoralized defenders retreated into their tunnels, the attackers changed their tactics by fighting in small groups, and using recoilless rifles and flamethrowers to gradually burn the NRA soldiers to death, including the tunnel complex of the Nationalist 4th Assault Group.

By 17:30, the battle on the islands subsided with the PLA having taken 95 hills over 132 meters, and the decimation of the NRA defenders was almost complete with 567 killed (mostly burned to death by the flamethrowers) and 519 captured alive according to the often exaggerated PRC source; or 712 soldiers and 12 political warfare female students (aka nurses) died in the line of duty according to Taiwan source. The Communist forces were then ordered to assume a defensive position for the next day, to prepare for a possible Nationalist counterattack that never materialized. Wang Shen-Ming, the NRA commander was on the phone mentioned he was 50 yards (45 meters) from the approaching Communists. He committed suicide with a hand grenade, ended all the communication and resistance at his 121 hill cave headquarter. Also on the January 19, the Communist force begun their shelling on Dachen Archipelago about 13,2 kilometers (8.12 miles) away, but these actions were still originally intended to prevent possible counterattacks.  Finally, on January 20, 1955, the islands were formally declared to be firmly in Communist hands.

Aftermath
The scale of the battle was minute, and the most important gain of the PLA was demoralizing the NRA willpower to continue holding on to some of the islets that were difficult to defend. The Nationalists became aware that the logistics of sending supplies from Taiwan were difficult with their old propeller-driven air force and a lack of Navy ships. The Nationalists lost a destroyer escort, theTaiping to a PLAN torpedo boat squadron. By then the Korean War was over, and the PLA had moved military resources including MiG fighter jets and warships to combat Nationalist resistance. This was the prelude to the eventual abandonment of Dachen island with the United States urging Taiwan not to spread themselves too thin. According to Taiwanese sources, the troop garrison consisted of mostly former fishermen/pirates and civil war refugees of the landlord class. Some of the female casualties were female interns from a Political Warfare College. 
There are a number of shrines, roads and even a restaurant today to commemorate the Nationalist resistance in Taiwan. The 18,000 refugees, soldiers, and their descendants retreated to Taiwan and some migrated to North America.

Over 500 bombs and 50,000 shells were fired on the two rocky islets. The PLA launched an amphibious assault with 182 aircraft, bombers, and long range artillery. Over 5,000 troops were landed with the mobilization of 30,000 civilians. It was considered an example of the PRC's modern warfare.

The government of the Republic of China reported that all 720 NRA troops died while inflicting casualties on thousands of enemy soldiers. This claim was proven false in 2011, when a prisoner of war from the battle, Chen Hsiao-pin, visited Taiwan. The People's Republic of China reported that the PLA killed 519 and captured 567 NRA troops.

See also
List of Battles of Chinese Civil War
National Revolutionary Army
History of the People's Liberation Army
Chinese Civil War
Chekiang Province, Republic of China

References

Citations

Sources 

 Zhu, Zongzhen and Wang, Chaoguang, Liberation War History, 1st Edition, Social Scientific Literary Publishing House in Beijing, 2000,  (set)
 Zhang, Ping, History of the Liberation War, 1st Edition, Chinese Youth Publishing House in Beijing, 1987,  (pbk.)
 Jie, Lifu, Records of the Liberation War: The Decisive Battle of Two Kinds of Fates, 1st Edition, Hebei People's Publishing House in Shijiazhuang, 1990,  (set)
 Literary and Historical Research Committee of the Anhui Committee of the Chinese People's Political Consultative Conference, Liberation War, 1st Edition, Anhui People's Publishing House in Hefei, 1987, 
 Li, Zuomin, Heroic Division and Iron Horse: Records of the Liberation War, 1st Edition, Chinese Communist Party History Publishing House in Beijing, 2004, 
 Wang, Xingsheng, and Zhang, Jingshan, Chinese Liberation War, 1st Edition, People's Liberation Army Literature and Art Publishing House in Beijing, 2001,  (set)
 Huang, Youlan, History of the Chinese People's Liberation War, 1st Edition, Archives Publishing House in Beijing, 1992, 
 Liu Wusheng, From Yan'an to Beijing: A Collection of Military Records and Research Publications of Important Campaigns in the Liberation War, 1st Edition, Central Literary Publishing House in Beijing, 1993, 
 Tang, Yilu and Bi, Jianzhong, History of Chinese People's Liberation Army in Chinese Liberation War, 1st Edition, Military Scientific Publishing House in Beijing, 1993 – 1997,  (Volum 1), 7800219615 (Volum 2), 7800219631 (Volum 3), 7801370937 (Volum 4), and 7801370953 (Volum 5)

External links 
 PLA side story of the battle

Yijiangshan Islands 1955
Conflicts in 1955
1955 in China
Military history of Taiwan